Graham Sweet (born 26 October 1948) is a British bobsledder. He competed in the four man event at the 1976 Winter Olympics. He also competed at the FIBT World Championships in 1975, where his team came in 12th place.

References

External links
 

1948 births
Living people
British male bobsledders
Olympic bobsledders of Great Britain
Bobsledders at the 1976 Winter Olympics
Sportspeople from Pontypridd